The Indian locomotive class WAM-4 is a class of 25 kV AC electric locomotives that was developed in 1970 by Chittaranjan Locomotive Works for Indian Railways. The model name stands for broad gauge (W), alternating current (A), mixed traffic (M) engine, 4th generation (4). They entered service in March 1971. A total of 500 WAM-4 were built at CLW between 1970 and 1983, which made them the most numerous class of mainline electric locomotive till its successor the WAG-5.

The WAM-4 is one of the most successful locomotives of Indian Railways having served both passenger and freight trains for over 52 years. This class provided the basic design for a number of other locomotives like WCAM-1, WAG-5A, WCG-2, and some WAP-1 models. However, with the advent of new 3-phase locomotives like WAP-5 and WAP-7, the WAM-4 locomotives were relegated to hauling smaller passenger trains and most of the units have been scrapped. A few units are in service performing backup and non essential duties.

History

Origins 
In the 1970s, the Indian Railways started a series of study projects for a high horsepower locomotive. Although the WAG-1/WAG-4 was being introduced, officials believed that a much larger and more capable locomotive was needed, especially to haul Freight trains that was heavy for any existing locomotives. The era of Co-Co locomotives, led by the enormous popularity of the WDM-2, had revolutionized long-distance travel. With the aim of addressing the shortcomings of the previous WAM-1/2 and WAG-1, WAG-2, WAG-3, WAG-4 classes and remove steam locomotives from IR by a target date of 1990. The WAM-1s were not great successes as some of their advanced features were unsuitable for Indian conditions.

so the designers at RDSO and CLW decided to use the following

 Instead of the Bo-Bo bogies of WAM-1/2, ALCO asymmetric Trimount bogies of the WDM-2 were provided for better traction and power.
 Silicon rectifiers with speed control by three series-parallel motor combinations and weak field operation.
 Auxiliaries from Westinghouse and Kirloskar (compressors), S F India (blowers) and Northey (exhauster)
 Air brakes for loco and vacuum train brakes fitted as original equipment with Rheostatic braking also provided
 MU operation made possible up to 4 units possible.

Production 
Production of these locomotives started in 1970 with #20400 and exactly 500 WAM-4s were built in 13 years with #21399 “Anant” being the last one. Production ended on August 3 1983. WAM-4 though an indigenously produced loco was heavily inspired by French box design and naturally favoured a French TM which was the Alstom made TAO TM. A single WAM-4 can generally haul up to a 24-coach passenger rake. This class proved so successful by virtue of its ruggedness suitable for Indian conditions and simplicity of maintenance. In January 2020, the last WAM-4 units (four from Tata ELS) were withdrawn from mainline service. Currently 8 locomotives are currently doing shunting and departmental works.

Rebuilding 
A number of locomotives were rebuilt as WAM-4B in the late 1970s to evaluate Alstom TAO 659 Traction Motors and for exclusive  use on freight duties. These 'locos' were  ballasted to improve traction and had excellent load-hauling capabilities, This experiment gave rise to the future WAG-5 locos.

Duties 
The class was designed for both passenger and freight work. Many of the original locomotives were fitted with vacuum brakes only. With the withdrawal of many WAG-1 and WAM-1 locomotives in the 1990s, the WAM-4 units were given air brakes  to prolong their life into the 1990s and beyond.

Sub-classes 
This loco class has been seen in many variations, as a lot of workshops and sheds have carried out their own enhancements or modifications to the basic loco design. Although the code indicates a mixed-use loco, most WAM-4's ended up hauling passenger trains.

Variants include

 WAM4B or G: Freight only (re geared version)
 WAM4D or DB: Dual Braked (Air and Vacuum)
 WAM4E: Air Brake only (for both loco and train)
 WAM4H: Hitachi Traction Motors instead of Alstom
 WAM4P: Passenger only (re geared version)
 WAM4/2S3P: 2 Traction Motors in Series, 3 in Parallel
 WAM4/6P: 6 traction motors permanently in parallel
 WAM4/6PE: Air braked, 6 Traction Motors perm. in parallel
 WAM4/6PDBHS: 6 Traction Motors permanently in parallel, Dual Brakes, High Speed
 WAM-4P D: Passenger only (dual brakes)
WAM-4P DB 6P and WAM-4 6P D: These are for superfast trains
WAM-4P DB 3P and WAM-4 2S-3P:  some superfasts, passengers

The 'DB' or 'D' generally, but perhaps not always, indicates dual-brake capability. 'HS' may be for 'high speed'.'2S', '3P', '6P', etc. indicate traction motors connected in series or parallel. The WAM-4 has six traction motors, and originally they were wired to be available in different configurations at different power settings. At notches up to 14, all motors were in series (at notch 14 all resistors dropping out); up to notch 21 in series-parallel combinations (three pairs of motors in series, the pairs themselves being in parallel); and further notches with all motors in parallel (at notch 30 all motors are in parallel with resistors dropping out). This is the original configuration of the WCAM-1 series of locomotives too.

The WAM-4 locomotives were later reconfigured to have all motors always in parallel (6P variants) or with the three series-connected pairs in parallel (2S 3P variants). Some WAM-4 locomotives from CLW are thought to have had the 2S 3P configuration right from the start. The 2S 3P configuration was better for the mixed traffic loads especially as it allowed the locomotives to start hauling larger loads without stalling. With increasing use of the WAM-4 locomotives for passenger traffic the all-parallel configuration was deemed more desirable since it allowed higher speeds and higher acceleration.

Livery 
This loco has the widest variety of liveries, with each loco shed having its own livery

Most of the WAM-4 locomotives now have their MU capability disabled as RDSO disapproves of these locomotives running MU'd over 100 km/h.

Named locomotives 
A few WAM-4 locomotives have been named by Indian Railways

Preserved Examples
As increasing numbers of WAM-4 have been retired, some have found their way into museums or other uses.
A few WAM-4 locomotives have been preserved by Indian Railways at various location around India

Locomotive sheds

Former sheds 
 Vadodara
 Visakhapatnam
 Itarsi
 Arakkonam
 Mughalsarai
 Lallaguda
 Vijayawada
 Bhusawal
 Valsad
 Howrah
 Jhansi
 Tughlakabad
 Tatanagar
 Bhilai

Technical specifications

Image Gallery

See also
Indian Railways
Locomotives of India
Rail transport in India

References

Bibliography

External links

Specifications
India railway fan club

Electric locomotives of India
25 kV AC locomotives
Co-Co locomotives
Railway locomotives introduced in 1970
5 ft 6 in gauge locomotives
Chittaranjan Locomotive Works locomotives